Promicromonospora is a Gram-positive and aerobic bacterial genus from the family Promicromonosporaceae.

References

Further reading 
 
 
 
 

Micrococcales
Bacteria genera